Adrian is a city in northern Bates County, Missouri, U.S. It is part of the Kansas City metropolitan area. The population was 1,677 at the 2010 census.

History
Adrian was platted in 1880 when the Missouri Pacific Railroad was extended to that point. Some say the city was named by settlers who hailed from Adrian, Michigan, while others believe the city was named after Adrian Talmadge, the son of a railroad official. A post office has been in operation at Adrian since 1880.

Geography
Adrian is located on Missouri Route 18 adjacent to the west side of US Route 71. Butler is approximately nine miles to the south. The community of Archie in southern Cass County is 5.5 miles to the north.

Demographics

2010 census
As of the census of 2010, there were 1,677 people, 685 households, and 430 families living in the city. The racial makeup of the city was 98.2% White, 0.2% African American, 0.5% Native American, 0.2% from other races, and 1.0% from two or more races. Hispanic or Latino of any race were 0.7% of the population.

There were 685 households, of which 33.9% had children under the age of 18 living with them, 47.9% were married couples living together, 10.2% had a female householder with no husband present, 4.7% had a male householder with no wife present, and 37.2% were non-families. 32.7% of all households were made up of individuals, and 19.1% had someone living alone who was 65 years of age or older. The average household size was 2.34 and the average family size was 2.99.

The median age in the city was 40.3 years. 25.6% of residents were under the age of 18; 6.7% were between the ages of 18 and 24; 22.9% were from 25 to 44; 25% were from 45 to 64; and 19.8% were 65 years of age or older. The gender makeup of the city was 46.3% male and 53.7% female.

2000 census
As of the census of 2000, there were 1,780 people, 682 households, and 469 families living in the city. The population density was 953.6 people per square mile (367.5/km). There were 734 housing units at an average density of 393.2 per square mile (151.6/km). The racial makeup of the city was 98.65% White, 0.39% Native American, 0.17% Asian, 0.06% Pacific Islander, 0.11% from other races, and 0.62% from two or more races. Hispanic or Latino of any race were 1.01% of the population.

There were 682 households, out of which 34.8% had children under the age of 18 living with them, 57.6% were married couples living together, 9.1% had a female householder with no husband present, and 31.1% were non-families. 28.4% of all households were made up of individuals, and 17.3% had someone living alone who was 65 years of age or older. The average household size was 2.51 and the average family size was 3.07.

In the city the population was spread out, with 26.6% under the age of 18, 8.7% from 18 to 24, 26.9% from 25 to 44, 17.3% from 45 to 64, and 20.5% who were 65 years of age or older. The median age was 37 years. For every 100 females, there were 90.2 males. For every 100 females age 18 and over, there were 80.6 males.

The median income for a household in the city was $31,436, and the median income for a family was $39,125. Males had a median income of $32,798 versus $22,727 for females. The per capita income for the city was $15,856. About 10.7% of families and 12.8% of the population were below the poverty line, including 19.8% of those under age 18 and 10.0% of those age 65 or over.

Attractions
Adrian's Frontier Village is the site of the annual Western Missouri Antique Tractor and Machinery Association Gas and Steam Engine Show.

Education
Adrian public schools are part of the Adrian R-III School District. Schools in the district include Adrian Elementary School, grades PreK through 5fifth, and Adrian Jr./Sr. High School, grades 6 through 12. Don Lile is the Superintendent of Schools.

The school mascot is the Blackhawks. The 2002 Blackhawk football team won Missouri's Class One Championship. In 1984 and 1992, Adrian won the Boys' Missouri Class 1A championship in track and field. The Blackhawks also won the 1994 Girls Class 2A Championship in track and field. In 2016, the varsity girls' basketball finished second in the state.

Media 
Newspapers
The Adrian Journal was published from 1889 to February 2015. 

Bates County Messenger launched in February 2015, when Lee Anna Schowengerdt bought the Adrian Journal and the Drexel Star. and was published weekly. The Messenger was discontinued in April 2017.

Notable people
 John Cowdery, Alaska politician
 Howard Maple, professional baseball athlete
 Randy Pike, former Missouri state legislator

References

External links
 Adrian Chamber of Commerce
 Adrian R-3 School District
 Historical Sanborn Fire Insurance Maps of Adrian (1894-1914) from University of Missouri digital library

Cities in Bates County, Missouri
Cities in Missouri
1880 establishments in Missouri